Capewell is a surname. Notable people with the surname include:

Bill Capewell (born 1878), former professional footballer, where he played in the Football League for Stoke
George Capewell (1843–1919), American inventor, born in Birmingham, England
Len Capewell (1895–1978), English professional footballer whose playing position was of a forward
Les Capewell (born 1948), retired English professional darts player who competed in the 1980s
Luke Capewell (born 1989), Australian professional rugby league footballer